The George Fisher Mine is a mine located near Mount Isa in Queensland, Australia. It is one of the largest zinc, lead and silver mines in the world. It mine has estimated reserves of 150.4 million ounces of silver. It was named after George Fisher, the former chairman of Mount Misa Mines.

Xstrata acquired the mine in 2003 when it took over MIM Holdings Limited. At the time there were known zinc reserves of 33 million tonnes. In 2010, the ore reserve estimate was 76 million tonnes. In 2013, Glencore merged with XStrata and the mine is now operated by Glencore.

See also

List of mines in Australia

References 

Silver mines in Queensland
North West Queensland
Underground mines in Australia